The 1949–50 Soviet Championship League season was the fourth season of the Soviet Championship League, the top level of ice hockey in the Soviet Union. 12 teams participated in the league, and CDKA Moscow won the championship.

Standings

External links
Season on hockeystars.ru

Soviet League seasons
1949–50 in Soviet ice hockey
Soviet